The Belden Shale is a geologic formation in Colorado near the town of McCoy. It preserves fossils dating back to the Carboniferous period.

See also

 List of fossiliferous stratigraphic units in Colorado
 Paleontology in Colorado

References

 

Carboniferous Colorado
Carboniferous southern paleotropical deposits